Mathaf: Arab Museum of Modern Art  (متحف : المتحف العربي للفن الحديث) in Doha, Qatar, offers an Arab perspective on modern and contemporary art and supports creativity, promotes dialogue and inspires new ideas. The museum boasts a collection of over 9,000 objects and also presents temporary exhibitions, library, and a robust educational program. Established in 2010, it is considered to be among the most important cultural attractions in the country.

Mathaf houses the world's largest collection of modern and contemporary Arab art.

History 

Mathaf (متحف in Arabic) translates to "museum". The initial collection was gathered by Sheikh Hassan bin Mohammed Al Thani, and QMA provided the conditions of conservation as a public institution chaired by Sheikha Al-Mayassa Al Thani. Sheikh Hassan started building a collection in the early 1990s of art created by artists from the Arab world over the last 200 years with the aim of creating a museum that could capture and represent artists from this region. From the 1990s and early 2000s, the collection was housed in two private villas in Madinat Khalifa in Doha while Sheikh Hassan and early advisors and staff conceived of an idea of what an Arab perspective on modern and contemporary art and museums could be. 

In 2010, the museum opened its doors in the Qatar Foundation's Education City in Doha in a former school building transformed by the French architect Jean-François Bodin. At the time, it was the first museum dedicated to modern and contemporary art in the country. Artist and former staff member Sophia Al-Maria recounts the early intentions of Sheikh Hassan and the founding team as shaping the institution to be a "twenty-first century ‘post-museum’…a fledgling term for transparent, interaction-oriented museum models.” The inaugural exhibitions included  "Sajjil: A Century of Modern Art," featuring 240 artworks by more than 100 artists curated by Nada Shabout, Wassan Al-Khudhairi, and Deena Chalabi; "Interventions: A Dialogue Between the Modern and the Contemporary," curated by Nada Shabout; and "Told / Untold / Retold," curated by Sam Bardaouil and Till Fellrath and featuring newly commissioned works by 23 contemporary artists.

In 2013, Mathaf launched the Encyclopedia of Modern Art and the Arab World, a resource offering detailed biographies that have been researched by scholars and independent historians as well as essays, videos, and interviews.

Wassan Al-Khudhairi was the inaugural chief curator and director of the museum, where she served from 2007–2012. Michelle Dezember served as interim director from 2012–2013. Moroccan curator Abdellah Karroum was appointed director of Mathaf in June 2013, where he served until May 2021. In November 2021, Qatar Museums appointed Zeina Arida as the new director of Mathaf.

Collection 

The 5,500-square-meter (59,000-square-foot) museum, located in a former school building in Doha’s Education City, has a collection of more than 9,000 artworks, as communicated in 2014, that offers a rare comprehensive overview of modern Arab art, representing the major trends spanning from the 1840s to the present. The collection was donated by Sheikh Hassan bin Mohamed bin Ali Al Thani to Qatar Foundation, and was later acquired by Qatar Museums Authority. It is thought to be one of the largest collections of Arab-produced paintings and sculptures in the world. Qatar Museums Authority chairwoman, Sheikha Al-Mayassa Al Thani, stated upon the opening of Mathaf in 2010 that, "[...] we are making Qatar the place to see, explore and discuss the creations of Arab artists of the modern era and of our own time."

Exhibitions 
Mathaf permanent collection exhibition occupies seven galleries in the upper floor, while the atrium and five galleries are dedicated to temporary exhibitions. The museum looks at major modern and contemporary movements represented in the collection. The permanent collection includes works by Etel Adnan, Yousef Ahmad, Manal AlDowayan, Farid Belkahia, Kamal Boullata, Saloua Raouda Choucair, Jilali Gharbaoui, Shirin Neshat, Shakir Hassan Al Said, Wael Shawky, and Chaibia Talal.

Mathaf opened on 30 December 2010 with an exhibition called Sajjil, which means "act of recording" in Arabic, and featured a cross-section of Arab art over the previous 100 years. Simultaneously, the museum hosted Interventions (an exhibition of new commissions by five pivotal modernist Arab artists (Dia Azzawi, Farid Belkahia, Ahmed Nawar, Ibrahim el-Salahi and Hassan Sharif) and Told/Untold/Retold, an ambitious exhibition of new commissions by twenty-three contemporary Arab artists.

Mathaf's following exhibition, Cai Guo-Qiang: Saraab, ran from 5 December 2011 to 26 May 2012. The first solo show to be organized by the museum, Cai Guo-Qiang: Saraab showcased more than fifty works, including seventeen newly commissioned artworks, by the renowned contemporary artist Cai Guo-Qiang. Saraab ("mirage") re-imagined historical relations between China and the Persian Gulf region and reaffirmed Mathaf's commitment to presenting a unique Arab perspective on modern and contemporary art. The exhibition opened with Cai Guo-Qiang's largest ever daytime explosion event, Black Ceremony.

Tea with Nefertiti: the Making of the Artwork by the Artist, the Museum and the Public was held from November 2012 to March 2013. Through revisiting the contested histories of how Egyptian collections have been amassed by numerous museums from the 19th century onwards, this exhibition brings together antiquities, modernist works, archives and 26 international contemporary artists and artist collectives.

In November 2014, Mathaf opened the permanent exhibition "Summary, Part 1" with 8,000 pieces of contemporary art.

Other exhibitions organized by Mathaf include:
 "Forever Now: Five Anecdotes from the Permanent Collection", which features new readings based on the works of five artists from Mathaf’s permanent collection.
 "Selections from the Collection", conceived by the curatorial team of Mathaf.
 "Khatt And After", which includes work from the permanent Collection of Mathaf: Arab Museum of Modern Art.
 "Adel Abdessemed: L'age d'or", curated by Pier Luigi Tazzi, November 2013 to January 2014.
 "Magdi Mostafa: Sound Element", Project Space, Mathaf, 2013.
 "Mathaf Permanent Collection: Paintings, sculptures and projects garden", December 2013 to February 2014.
 "Mona Hatoum: Turbulence", 2014.
 "Manal AlDowayan: Crash", 2014, curated by Laura Barlow.
 "Etel Adnan In All Her Dimensions", 2014, curated by Hans Ulrich Obrist.
 "The Closest I've Ever Come to a Scientific Experiment", by Ghadah Alkandari, curated by Ala Younis, 2014.
 "Shirin Neshat: Afterwards", curated by Abdellah Karroum, November 2014 to February 2015.
 "Wael Shawky: Crusades and Other Stories", 2015, curated by Abdellah Karroum.
 "Dia Azzawi: A Retrospective (from 1963 until tomorrow)", curated by Catherine David, 2016.
 "Bouthayna Al-Muftah: Echoes", July to September 2018.
"Fateh Moudarres: Colour, Exetnsity and Sense", curated by Sara Raza, October 2018.
"Raqs Media Collective: Still More World", curated by Laura Barlow, 2019.
"M. F. Husain: Horses of the Sun", curated by Ranjit Hoskote, March 2019.
"El Anatsui: Triumphant Scale", curated by Okwui Enwezor, October 2019.
"Yto Barrada: My Very Educated Mother Just Served Us Nougat", curated by Laura Barlow, August 2020.
"Huguette Caland: Faces and Places", curated by Mohammed Rashid Al Thani, August 2020.
"Kader Attia: On Silence", curated by Abdellah Karroum, November 2021 to March 2022.
"Majaz: Contemporary Art Qatar", September 2022 to February 2023.
"Taysir Batniji: No Condition is Permanent", co-curated by Abdellah Karroum and Lina Ramadan, September 2022 to January 2023.
"Sophia Al-Maria: Invisible Labors Daydream Therapy", curated by Amal Al Haag, September 2022 to January 2023.
"One Tiger or Another", curated by Tom Eccles and Mark Rappolt, September 2022 to January 2023.
"Almaha Almaadeed: Inspired by the Land", curated by Noora Abdulmajeed, September 2022 to January 2023.

Education initiatives 
As a museum founded on the premise of education and scholarship, there are a wide number of programs to engage multiple audiences including schools, universities, families, artists, and scholars. Highlights include the program Mathaf Voices, which trains local university students to give exhibition tours from their own perspectives, and Artist Encounters, which invites artists to discuss concepts and lead workshops based on their processes. The museum also houses a library.

Research initiatives 
The museum, in collaboration with Qatar Foundation, has published an online encyclopedia containing the biographies of Arab artists. The Encyclopaedia of Modernity and the Arab World is published by Mathaf Curatorial and Research department, as a peer reviewed platform linking the museum to University.

Gallery

References

External links 
Mathaf's 
Qatar Museums Authority
Art Daily
The Arab Museum of Modern Art in Qatar
Mathaf: Arab Museum of Modern Art within Google Arts & Culture

Buildings and structures in Doha
Art museums established in 2010
Art museums and galleries in Qatar
Contemporary art galleries
Modern art museums
2010 establishments in Qatar
Organisations based in Doha
Arab art scene